Jaghin may refer to:
 Jaghin, Hajjiabad
 Jaghin, Rudan
 Jaghin District
 Jaghin-e Jonubi Rural District
 Jaghin-e Shomali Rural District

See also
 Jaghan (disambiguation)